Nyctegretis is a genus of moths of the family Pyralidae described by Philipp Christoph Zeller in 1848.

Species
Nyctegretis aenigmella P. Leraut, 2002
Nyctegretis cullinanensis Balinsky, 1991
Nyctegretis inclinella Ragonot, 1888
Nyctegretis leonina (Hampson, 1930)
Nyctegretis lineana (Scopoli, 1786)
Nyctegretis ruminella La Harpe, 1860
Nyctegretis triangulella Ragonot, 1901

References

Phycitini
Pyralidae genera